3,4-Methylenedioxy-N-hydroxy-N-methylamphetamine (MDHMA; FLEA) is an entactogen, psychedelic, and stimulant of the phenethylamine and amphetamine chemical classes. It is the N-hydroxy homologue of MDMA ("Ecstasy"), and the N-methyl homologue of MDOH. MDHMA was first synthesized and assayed by Alexander Shulgin. In his book PiHKAL (Phenethylamines i Have Known And Loved), Shulgin listed the dosage range as 100–160 mg, and the duration as approximately 4–8 hours. He describes MDHMA as causing entactogenic and open MDMA-like effects, easing communication, and increasing appreciation of the senses.

Legality

United Kingdom
This substance is a Class A drug in the Drugs controlled by the UK Misuse of Drugs Act.

References

External links 
 MDHMA Entry in PiHKAL
 MDHMA Entry in PiHKAL • info

Substituted amphetamines
Designer drugs
Benzodioxoles
Serotonin-norepinephrine-dopamine releasing agents
Methamphetamines
Entactogens and empathogens
Hydroxylamines